Stefan Jon Sigurgeirsson (born 19 May 1989) is an alpine skier from Iceland.  He competed for Iceland at the 2010 Winter Olympics.  His best finish was a 45th place in the super-G.

References

External links

1989 births
Living people
Icelandic male alpine skiers
Alpine skiers at the 2010 Winter Olympics
Olympic alpine skiers of Iceland